"Pop Style" is a song by Canadian rapper Drake, featuring American rappers Kanye West and Jay-Z, collectively known as The Throne. The song was released alongside "One Dance", as singles promoting Drake's fourth studio album Views, initially for exclusive digital download on iTunes on April 5, 2016. The album version features only Drake with a new verse. The single version was nominated for Best Rap Performance at the 59th Grammy Awards.

Background
The song is a collaboration between Drake and Kanye West and Jay-Z (collectively known as "The Throne", a reference to their collaborative album, Watch The Throne). It is the first time the three have appeared on the same track. However, the contribution from Jay-Z is limited in the song, with only two lines from Jay-Z making the cut ("They still out to get me, they don't get it/ I can not be gotten, that's a given"). In an extended version of the song the lines by Jay-Z were used as the start of a new verse. Also appearing in the song is Kanye saying "Imma let you finish", referencing his controversial statement during the 2009 MTV Video Music Awards, and the "Perfect" sample (Street Fighter II) used in his seventh studio album, The Life of Pablo.  Kanye West has also performed the song live. In the lyrics, Drake mentions Channing Tatum, Justin Timberlake and his song "Rock Your Body".

Chart performance
In the United States, "Pop Style" debuted and peaked at No. 16 on the US Billboard Hot 100 on April 12, 2016; it sold 128,000 copies on two days of sales, also debuting atop the US Digital Songs chart.  It also debuted at No. 4 on the Hot R&B/Hip-Hop Songs and No. 1 on the R&B/Hip-Hop Digital Songs charts. As of October 2016, it has sold 539,000 copies in the United States.

Personnel 
The following are credited as songwriters. Adapted from Jaxsta.

Production

 Sevn Thomas – production, drum programming, arrangement
 Frank Dukes – production, instrumentation
 Boi-1da – additional production, drum programming, bass guitar
 40 – additional production, bass guitar
 Drake – vocals
 Kanye West – vocals
 Jay-Z – vocals

Technical

 Noel Cadastre – recording
 40 – recording
 Greg Moffett – assistant engineer
 Harley Arsenault – assistant engineer
 Michael Brooks – assistant mixer
 Tom "Classic" Hardy – assistant mixer

Charts

Weekly charts

Year-end charts

Certifications

Notes

References

External links
Lyrics of this song at Genius

Drake (musician) songs
2015 songs
2016 singles
Songs written by Drake (musician)
Cash Money Records singles
Kanye West songs
Songs written by Kanye West
Songs written by Jay-Z
Songs written by Frank Dukes
Jay-Z songs
Songs written by Sevn Thomas
Song recordings produced by Frank Dukes